Pictocolumbella ocellata, common name : the lightning dove shell,  is a species of sea snail, a marine gastropod mollusk in the family Columbellidae, the dove snails.

Description
The shell size varies between 13 mm and 20 mm. the colour of the shell is commonly a dark brown colour but can also be found in a red or orange. the pattern on the outside of the shell varies between zigzags, small spots and triangle like shapes all in a white or yellowish colour. the tip of the shell is white and near the opening it turns into a pinkish colour.

Distribution
This species is distributed in the Indian Ocean along Madagascar and in the Western Pacific (in warm tropical water).

The Lightning Dove Shell lives on sandy and muddy bottom, the shell colour varies grately.

References

 Dautzenberg, Ph. (1929). Mollusques testacés marins de Madagascar. Faune des Colonies Francaises, Tome III
 Richmond, M. (Ed.) (1997). A guide to the seashores of Eastern Africa and the Western Indian Ocean islands. Sida/Department for Research Cooperation, SAREC: Stockholm, Sweden. . 448 pp.

External links
 

Columbellidae
Gastropods described in 1807